The Simón Bolívar Great Patriotic Pole (GPPSB) is a left-wing socialist and chavist electoral alliance/popular front of Venezuelan political parties created in 2012 to support the re-election of Hugo Chávez in the 2012 presidential election.

The organisation, which formally unites 35,000 Venezuelan movements and collectives, is led by Nicolás Maduro's United Socialist Party of Venezuela (Partido Socialista Unido de Venezuela, PSUV). Although the coalition shares a name with the "Sovereign Front" of the 1998 presidential election, the 1998 coalition was one of political parties, and did not include the wide range of social movements and community organisations involved in the GPP. For example, in Mérida state the GPP includes "[m]ovements such as the Tupamaros, the Educational Community Socialist Front, the Frebin (the Bolivarian Front of Researchers and Innovators), the student movement Community Integration, the comrades in the rural workers front- the Campesino Front Ezequiel Zamora, the popular educators network, the Women’s Bicentennial Front, and... Tatuy TV".

A member of the regional promoter team of the GPP in Mérida state said in February 2012: in order to form the GPP, there are a range of stages to go through. The first stage was the formation of the national promoter team, which was sworn in and approved by the president. It is made up of 153 comrades, spokespeople of different collectives at a national level. That stage ended with the national registration in October 2011. Next came the second stage of regrouping, which are the ongoing meetings of all the collectives registered in the GPP. After that, which is where we are at now, comes the stage of carrying out the popular assemblies of the GPP. These are where the planning, decision making, and debating of all those participating in the GPP takes place. Finally, there is a last stage, which consists of the national congress, or the national popular assembly, with President Chavez. That will be held on 13 April this year and it’s where the new proposals for the national organisation will be discussed and voted on.

Members
The GPP is currently composed of the following political parties:

Election results

Parliamentary

Presidential

Regional

Municipal

See also
Democratic Unity Roundtable – the opposing electoral alliance
Popular Revolutionary Alternative – a breakaway electoral alliance

Notes
 Also includes some centre-left parties and one right-wing party, but is dominated by the left-wing other than on social policies such as abortion and LGBT rights.

References

External links
granpolopatriotico.org.ve

2011 establishments in Venezuela
Bolivarian Revolution
Far-left politics in Venezuela
Hugo Chávez
Left-wing political party alliances
Organizations established in 2011
Political party alliances in Venezuela
Politics of Venezuela
Popular fronts
Socialist parties in Venezuela
Venezuela